Aulonocara nyassae, known as the emperor cichlid, is a species of haplochromine Cichlid that is endemic to Lake Malawi in Africa. It has been recorded from the southeastern arm of the lake and may be present in the southwestern arm. This species was known only from its holotype, which was collected at the turn of the century, until more specimens were collected in the 1990s.

Sources

Fish of Malawi
nyassae
Taxa named by Charles Tate Regan
Fish described in 1922
Fish of Lake Malawi